The 1980 Embassy World Indoor Bowls Championship  was held at the Coatbridge indoor bowling club, North Lanarkshire, Scotland, from 25 February to 2 March 1980.

David Bryant won his second consecutive title beating Philip Chok in the final.

Draw and results

Men's singles

Group stages
Group A results

Group B results

Medal round

References

External links
Official website

World Indoor Bowls Championship
1980 in bowls